Euagina, also known as Sebagena and Eudagina, was a town of ancient Cappadocia, inhabited during Roman and Byzantine times.

Its site is located near Gemerek, Asiatic Turkey.

References

Populated places in ancient Cappadocia
Former populated places in Turkey
Populated places of the Byzantine Empire
Roman towns and cities in Turkey
History of Sivas Province